Motor Bicycle is a 2016 Sri Lankan romantic action drama film written and directed by Shameera Rangana Naotunna as his maiden cinematic direction. Film produced by Suranga Jayasuriya for Imagery Films and Roy Brothers. Film starring Dasun Pathirana, Samanalee Fonseka in lead roles along with Veena Jayakody, Mahendra Perera and Kumara Thirimadura in supportive role., it is set in modern-day urban Colombo and focuses on a boy dreams to ride a motor bicycle with his love. It is the 1256th Sri Lankan film in the Sinhala cinema.

In 2015, the film won the Best Film award and the Best Direction award at 2015 SAARC Film Festival.

Plot
Rangana is a 26 years old boy. His first ambition is to become a singer. Second ambition is to buy a motor bicycle. He lives with his mother. Mother is doing a small business to carry out their lives. Rangana plays a guitar in a club. He dreams to ride a motor bicycle with his girlfriend. His music is a headache to the neighbors. With all these problems, he continued his musical practice.

He forces her to sell her golden necklace to buy a motor bicycle for him. Mother accepts the request of her son reluctantly for the sake of his son's happiness. He buys a used motor bicycle which has been stolen from someone.

Cast
 Dasun Pathirana as Rangana
 Samanalee Fonseka as Tania
 Veena Jayakody as Rangana's mother
 Mahendra Perera as Manju
 Kumara Thirimadura as Three wheel driver
 Kalana Gunasekara as Jimma
 Nethalie Nanayakkara as Patta's mother
 Dimuthu Chinthaka as Police officer
 Chamara Priyadarshana as Chamara
 Chamal Ranasinghe as Sudda
 Shalitha Gunawardena as Shalitha
 Chandana Weerasinghe as Oscar
 Lasantha Udukumbura as Mayya

Reception
The film received praise from critics for the performance of film cast. Cinematographer, editor and music composer of the film is well praised for their contribution. Some critics opined that Motor Bicycle did not perform well in the end of the film.

Awards and nominations

Soundtracks

The soundtrack of the film is composed by Ajith Kumarasiri, with lyrics written by Shameera Rangana Naotunna, Upul Shantha Sannasgala and Ajith Kumarasiri.

Track listing

References